Terrestrial broadcast can refer to:

 Terrestrial television
 Terrestrial radio